Valeri Pavlovich Gladilin (born 19 October 1951) is a Russian politician and a former professional football coach and a player. He works as a president of FC Dnepr Smolensk. He also serves in the State Duma (elected from the United Russia party). From 2004 to 2008 he served in the Federation Council of Russia.

Honours
 Soviet Top League runner-up: 1974, 1983, 1984.

External links
 

1951 births
Footballers from Moscow
Living people
Soviet footballers
Soviet Top League players
FC Spartak Moscow players
FC Kairat players
FC Lokomotiv Moscow players
FC Ural Yekaterinburg players
Navbahor Namangan players
Soviet football managers
Expatriate footballers in Kazakhstan
Russian football managers
FC Dynamo Saint Petersburg managers
Members of the Federation Council of Russia (after 2000)
Fifth convocation members of the State Duma (Russian Federation)
Russian expatriate sportspeople in Kazakhstan
Russian sportsperson-politicians
Association football midfielders
FC Yenisey Krasnoyarsk players